The Fujifilm X100 is a series of digital compact cameras with a fixed prime lens. Originally part of the FinePix line, then becoming a member of the X series from Fujifilm, the X100 series includes the FinePix X100, X100S, X100T, X100F, and X100V. They each have a large image sensor and a 23 mm lens (35 mm equivalent angle of view in full frame format). All five cameras have received generally positive reviews.

The Fujifilm FinePix X100 was initially shown at the photokina show in September 2010 and was subsequently introduced in February 2011. It was the first model in the Fujifilm X-series of cameras and has since been joined by numerous models. It is superseded by the Fujifilm X100S.

Fujifilm FinePix X100 
The FinePix X100, the original model in the line, was introduced in 2011. This was the first camera in what would grow to become the Fujifilm X series although that designation came later. The X100 is a rangefinder-style camera.

Key features 
 12.3 MP, APS-C sized CMOS sensor
 Hybrid optical/electric viewfinder
 23 mm (35 mm equivalent) fixed prime lens
 Classic styling

Innovation 
The FinePix X100 was the first camera to show a number of new technologies developed by Fujifilm. These include a hybrid viewfinder which allows the user to choose between a conventional optical viewfinder with an electronic overlay, or an electronic viewfinder. The combination of APS-C sized CMOS sensor, EXR processor and 23mm (35 mm equivalent) fast aperture lens was also a first.

Reception 
The X100 received generally favourable reviews and a number of awards. These include Innovative Camera of the Year from Ephotozine and Best Premium Camera in the 2011 TIPA awards.
In most cases, the prizes were awarded for the combination of technology and picture quality, but the X100 has also received plaudits for its design outside the photography market, coming top of Stuff magazine's Cool List for 2011 and in October 2012 receiving Good Design Award from Good Design Award (Japan).
Digital Photography Review gave it a score of 75% and a silver award, noting that it "combines excellent image quality, solid build and a superb viewfinder with somewhat sluggish and quirky operation", adding that "It's been much improved by multiple firmware updates since its initial incarnation, and despite its flaws, is now a very likeable camera indeed.".

Issues 
Some X100 cameras have reportedly suffered from 'sticky aperture disease' where the aperture blades lock up, leading to overexposure. Fujifilm has acknowledged this issue and will fix it under warranty.

On initial release the X100 was widely reported to have various issues. Many, but not all, of these issues were fixed through a series of firmware updates made available by Fujifilm.

Fujifilm X100S

The Fujifilm X100S (Second)  is the successor to the Fujifilm FinePix X100. Announced in January 2013, it is a model similar to the X100 yet addressing some of the issues that the X100 had, and resembles it superficially, but with internal changes. It has been compared with the Leica M series.

It was replaced in September 2014 with the Fujifilm X100T.

Differences from the X100
 16.3 MP Fujifilm X-Trans CMOS II sensor instead of 12.3 MP CMOS sensor with primary colour filter (Bayer filter)
 Redesign of menus
 Quick Menu (Q) button
 Uses X-Trans color filter pattern (taken from the X-E1 and X-Pro1), instead of Bayer pattern
 No optical low pass filter (OLPF), to give sharper images
 Phase detection within the X-Trans CMOS II sensor increasing autofocus speed to 0.08 s in good light
 The faster the focus ring is rotated, the quicker the focus is adjusted
 Focus mode switch options have been reorganised such that the most commonly used functions (Autofocus Single and Manual Focus) surround the least used function (Autofocus Continuous) for more efficient operation
 Hybrid viewfinder switch has been altered in shape to allow for easier one-handed operation
 Autofocus point selection has been altered to allow one button default access

Reception
The X100S received generally positive reviews: 
 Digital Photography Review gave it a score of 81% and a gold award, describing it as a "hugely likable, very capable camera with some useful tricks up its sleeve". 
 Photography Life gave it 4.6 stars out of 5, describing it as "an amazing camera".

Fujifilm X100T

The Fujifilm X100T (Third) was announced by Fujifilm on September 10, 2014. It is the successor to the X100S.  It is visually very similar to the X100S, and shares many of its core specifications (including its lens and sensor), but features numerous iterative refinements and enhancements. It has the same 16.3 MP Fujifilm X-Trans CMOS II sensor as the X100S.

It was replaced in January 2017 with the Fujifilm X100F.

Differences from the X100S
 Advanced hybrid viewfinder, with electronic rangefinder
 Real-time parallax correction in optical viewfinder
 ±3EV exposure compensation
 optional electronic shutter (allowing silent operation and a shutter speed of 1/32000 of a second)
 3.0-inch, 1040K-dot LCD screen
 "Classic Chrome" film simulation mode
 Built-in Wi-Fi
 Face recognition (when enabled, focuses automatically on the faces in the frame)

Reception
The X100T has received generally positive reviews:
 Digital Photography Review gave it a score of 81%, criticising its autofocus and video capabilities but noting "there's currently nothing to touch it in terms of the size/price/image quality balance it offers and the style with which it does so". 
 Pocket-Lint.com gave it 4 stars out of 5, describing it as "a special little camera"

Fujifilm X100F

The Fujifilm X100F (Fourth), announced on January 19, 2017 is the successor to the Fujifilm X100T. The launch involved a number of videos from X-Photographers addressing the new features, see launch video.  It features a number of improvements and refinements over the previous model, many of which were first introduced with the Fujifilm X-Pro2. The X100F was released on February 23, 2017.

Differences from the X100T
 A third-generation 24.3 MP X-Trans CMOS III sensor
 X-Processor Pro image processor
 A new button layout with a joystick autofocus control (similar to X-Pro2 and X-T2), making it easier to select AF points
 Built-In ISO dial
 Added command dial on the front of the camera
 C mode on exposure compensation dial, allowing up to 5 stops exposure compensation
 A larger battery, model NP-W126S (same as X-T2)
 An improved 91-point autofocus system
 Improved sensitivity (ISO 200–12800, expandable to ISO 100–51200)
 Viewfinder has 6x magnification
 Acros film simulation
 60 fps EVF refresh rate
 Additional continuous shooting mode speeds (3, 4, 5, and 8 fps) along with larger buffer
 New LED AF lamp
 Digital teleconverter simulating 50 mm and 70 mm perspectives (JPG only)

Reception
The X100F was very well received, mostly for its improved sensor and autofocus capability. Digital Photography Review gave it a score of 83% and a gold award, calling it "a true photographers' camera". At the 2017 Technical Image Press Association Awards, the X100F won the award for best professional compact camera.

Fujifilm X100V 

The Fujifilm X100V (Roman Numeral "Fifth"), announced on February 4, 2020, is the successor to the Fujifilm X100F. It features a redesigned lens, a fourth generation X-Trans sensor, a 2-way tilting rear LCD screen, and partial weather resistance. The camera also includes additional film simulation modes and other software improvements. The X100V is $100 more expensive than its predecessor, the X100F. With its redesigned lens system, it was found to exhibit less distortion than the previous X100 cameras and has an improved close focus performance.

Differences from the X100F 
4th generation 26.1 MP X-Trans CMOS sensor
Sharper 23 mm ƒ/2.0 lens
4K Video recording
2-way tilting rear LCD screen
Touchscreen
Weather resistance (when used with a lens filter)
Larger, higher resolution OLED viewfinder
Increased focus points to 425
Bluetooth
UHS I Card Support
Faster continuous shooting at 11 fps
Rear 4-way controller is replaced by a mini joystick and touchscreen functions
Four rear black buttons are flush to the surface
USB-C 3.1 port

Reception 
The X100V is a well received camera, being praised for its updated sensor that offers good noise performance and fast readout as well as its highly tunable JPEG engine that reduces noise very well producing good detail. It was also praised for its 4k recording feature, a first for the series. Digital Photography Review gave it a score of 86% and a gold award, calling it "the most capable prime-lens compact camera, ever".

X100 chronology 

Image processor: 
EXR | 
X-Trans II | 
X-Trans III | 
X-Trans IV

Accessories
Due to their similarities, the different X100 cameras accept many of the same accessories.

Conversion lenses
 Wide Conversion Lens WCL-X100 II – gives a magnification factor to the 23 mm fixed lens of 0.8×, providing a focal length of 19 mm (28 mm equivalent)
 Tele Conversion Lens TCL-X100 II – multiplies the 23 mm fixed lens by approximately 1.4×, providing an equivalent focal length of 33 mm (50 mm equivalent angle of view)
 Tele Conversion Lens TCL-X100 – as above but with manual mode switching in the camera menus.

Flashguns
 Fujifilm EF-20
 Fujifilm EF-X20
 Fujifilm EF-42

See also
 Fujifilm X series
 Fujifilm cameras

Notes

References

External links 
 Official website of the original FinePix X100 (Wayback Machine Archive)
 Official Fujifilm Global website of the original FinePix X100
 Official Fujifilm Global website of the X100S
 Official Fujifilm Global website of the X100T
 Official Fujifilm Global website of the X100F
 

X100
Mirrorless cameras
Products introduced in 2010
Products introduced in 2013
Products introduced in 2014